The following is a listing of all 20 current Overwatch League (OWL) teams ranked by win–loss record percentage (winning percentage), accurate as of the end of the 2021 season.

Regular season
Key:

Midseason tournaments
The following listing does not include qualifying matches and is accurate as of the end of the 2021 regular season. The listing ranks the OWL teams based on their winning percentage during midseason tournament matches. The 2018 and 2019 seasons contained four and three stage playoffs (midseason tournaments), respectively, throughout the regular season. The 2020 season onwards replaced the stage playoffs with midseason tournaments.

Every team has qualified for at least one midseason tournament. The Shanghai Dragons have the most midseason tournament titles (5), the most played matches (22), won the most matches (17), and logged the most maps wins (64). The San Francisco Shock have highest map differential (+35) and highest winning percentage (.824). The New York Excelsior have logged the most map losses (39) and are tied with the Atlanta Reign for the most match losses (10). Every team has won at least one match in midseason tournaments. The Reign registered the lowest map differential (−12). The Houston Outlaws hold the distinction of having lost the most matches (5) among the teams with the lowest number of wins (1). Nine teams have registered a map tie midseason tournament history.

Key:

Season playoffs 
The following listing does not include play-in tournaments and is accurate as of the end of the 2021 Overwatch League playoffs.

Key:

References

Win loss records
Sports standings
21st century-related lists